Katonah is the debut studio album by Boston area indie rock group Apollo Sunshine, released on October 7, 2003 on spinART Records.

Background
Jeremy Black and Sam Cohen met at Berklee College of Music in 1997 while attending a summer performance program, and then met Jesse Gallagher while attending the school full-time. Their musical tastes won the approval of professor Andy Edelstein, who taught classes Black and Cohen were in. Edelstein agreed to travel to Katonah, New York four days a week to produce the band's first album, which was about to be recorded in a large shed on Black's parents' property (featured in "Before and After" photos on the album's cover and sleeve art) which was constructed in May and June 2002.

Recording
Recording commenced in June and wrapped in September, with post-production completing in June 2003 in Arlington, Massachusetts.

Track listing

References

2003 debut albums
Apollo Sunshine albums